Dendropsophus koechlini is a species of frog in the family Hylidae, known commonly as Koechlin's treefrog.
It is found in Bolivia, Brazil, Peru, and possibly Colombia.
Its natural habitats are subtropical or tropical moist lowland forests and intermittent freshwater marshes.

References

koechlini
Amphibians described in 1989
Taxonomy articles created by Polbot